Archbishop Pavle may refer to:

 Pavle of Smederevo, Archbishop of Peć and self-proclaimed Serbian Patriarch c. 1527 – 1541
 Pavle Nenadović, Serbian Orthodox Archbishop of Karlovci, from 1749 to 1768
 Pavle, Serbian Patriarch, Archbishop of Peć and Serbian Patriarch from 1990 to 2009

See also
Pavle (disambiguation)
Patriarch Pavle (disambiguation)
List of heads of the Serbian Orthodox Church